"Go" is a song by American electronica musician Moby, released in March 1991 by record label Instinct as the first single from his self-titled debut album (1992). It peaked within the top ten of the charts in the Netherlands and the United Kingdom.

Background 
"Go", in its original form, was first released as the B-side to Moby's debut single "Mobility" in November 1990. Moby later composed an alternate mix of the song, built around string samples from Angelo Badalamenti's "Laura Palmer's Theme" from the television series Twin Peaks, which was released as a single in its own right in March 1991.

The title of the single version, "Woodtick Mix", is a reference to episode seven of Twin Peaks, when special agent Dale Cooper gets shot three times after folding up his bulletproof vest while chasing a wood tick as revealed in episode eight. Moby himself admitted so in his book.

"Go" samples the titular vocal from Tones on Tail's song "Go!". The "yeah" vocal which features prominently in the track is actually a sample from soul singer Jocelyn Brown, taken from her 1985 single "Love's Gonna Get You".

Release 
"Go" was released in March 1991 by Instinct Records. The song peaked within the top ten of the charts in the Netherlands and the United Kingdom. An accompanying promotional music video for the song was released, directed by Ondrej Rudavsky. Moby recalled, "When it was released, my dream was for it to sell 4,000 copies. It did a couple of million, including compilations. And I really thought that when DJs played 'Go', it was because they were taking pity on me for making such a mediocre song. I guess it's a good thing I'm not a record company executive, huh?"

Fourteen different remixes of "Go" were collected and combined into an entire continuous CD as a bonus disc for Moby's 1996 compilation album Rare: The Collected B-Sides 1989–1993. Another mix was produced for the compilation I Like to Score, released the following year. Trentemøller produced a remix for Moby's 2006 compilation Go – The Very Best of Moby; on the UK version of the album, the I Like to Score mix of the song appears instead. Drum and bass group Fourward released a remix of the song on a Moby Remix sampler in 2017.

Critical reception 
An editor from Rolling Stone remarked that the single "heralded techno's first real DJ superstar. The New York-based producer and artist initially hit big in British clubs with "Go", animating the stiff bleeps and blips of early techno by placing them atop the eerie Twin Peaks theme and dropping in a booty-shaking groove. The sound of drums sucked backward over interspersed shouts of go made this underground track appeal to club audiences as well as to ravers, and paved the way for more experimental producers and DJs to enter the world of mainstream dance." Tony Fletcher from Spin felt that Moby has produced "one of this year's most alluring club hits", utilizing strings from the TV-series "for haunting effect".

Legacy 
In 2010, "Go" was ranked number 134 in Pitchforks Top 200 Tracks of the 1990s list. In 2022, Rolling Stone ranked it number 69 in their list of 200 Greatest Dance Songs of All Time.

Track listing

Charts

References

External links 
 
 

Moby songs
1991 singles
Songs written by Moby
Songs written by Angelo Badalamenti
1990 songs
Instinct Records singles
Music Week number-one dance singles